The Lord's slope is a geographical gradient at Lord's Cricket Ground in London, England.

History 
The land on which Lord's was built was originally near a duck pond on a hill in St. John's Wood. It was leased by Thomas Lord following a request from George Finch, 9th Earl of Winchilsea to find a location where cricket could be played in relative privacy. Lord's was built around the slope and was enclosed by stands. In the 21st century, there were calls for the slope to be levelled as a result of the advent of drop-in pitches. Smaller ridges in the pitch had previously been removed by surveyors. However, the Marylebone Cricket Club rejected these calls stating that removal of the slope would require rebuilding of Lord's and would mean that the ground would be unable to host Test cricket for five years as the new pitch would need time to mature after the levelling. In 2002, the Lord's outfield was replaced and drainage installed. During this work, several small deviations in the pitch were removed, but the slope remained. During the 2012 Summer Olympics, when Lord's hosted the Archery tournament, there were suggestions that the slope would affect the archers. However, British archer Alison Williamson rejected this, stating that the slope was barely noticeable.

Cricket 
The Lord's slope is often used to advantage by bowlers in cricket matches at Lord's. Because of the slope's angles, seam bowlers from the Pavilion End and swing bowlers from the Nursery End gain an advantage as the natural variation of the slope alters the bounce of the ball when bowling. The gradient of the slope is noted to affect right-handed batsmen more than left-handed batsmen as the ball naturally moves towards left-handed batsmen. Despite the advantages the slope gives to bowlers, some batsmen consistently make high scores when playing at Lord's.

References 

Cricket culture
Geography of the City of Westminster
Lord's
Sports culture in the United Kingdom